Borić is a surname found in Croatia mainly among Croats, but also among Serbs and Bosniaks. They were historically present around the town of Senj.

It may refer to:

 Anthony Boric (born 1983), New Zealand rugby player of Croatian descent
 Drazen Boric, German paralympic athlete
 Gabriel Boric (born 1986), Chilean politician of Croatian descent, current President of Chile
 Olga Boric-Lubecke, American engineer of Serbian origin
 Rada Borić (born 1951), Croatian scholar, feminist, and women's rights activist
 Thomas Boric (born 1961), American wrestler of Croatian origin best known as Paul Diamond
 Vladimiro Boric Crnosija (1905–1973), Chilean clergyman and bishop of Croatian descent

References

Croatian surnames
Serbian surnames
Bosnian surnames